Johnny Miller (born December 25, 1965) is an American racing driver.

Miller has 100 career starts in the Trans-Am road racing series, including two wins and 67 top ten finishes. Miller finished in the top ten in Trans-Am points from 1998–2004 with career victories in 2000–2004.

Miller is also considered a road course ringer in the NASCAR Nextel Cup Series. Miller has raced for Morgan-McClure Motorsports and Front Row Motorsports, for a total of 3 races.

Motorsports career results

NASCAR
(key) (Bold – Pole position awarded by qualifying time. Italics – Pole position earned by points standings or practice time. * – Most laps led.)

Nextel Cup Series

References

External links
 Official Website
 

1965 births
Living people
NASCAR drivers
Trans-Am Series drivers
People from Johnson City, Tennessee
Racing drivers from Tennessee